Byce is a surname. Notable people with the surname include:

Charles Henry Byce (1916–1994), Cree-Canadian soldier
John Byce (born 1967), American ice hockey player

See also
Boyce (surname)
Ryce